Normal (full title Normal: The Düsseldorf Ripper) is Anthony Neilson's fictional account of Peter Kürten's life, told from the point of view of his lawyer. It is considered to be Neilson's breakthrough play.

The play was first performed at the Pleasance Theatre, Edinburgh on 7 August 1991 and transferred to Finborough Theatre, London on 1 October 1991. It was directed by Anthony Neilson and designed by Michael T. Roberts. It was revived at Styx, London in 2017, with Emma Baggott directing.

Normal was published in Neilson Plays 1: Normal, Penetrator, Year of the Family, Night Before Christmas, Censor, Methuen Drama 1998, .

In 2009 it was adapted into the Czech film Angels Gone.

References 

1991 plays
Plays set in Germany
Plays set in the 1910s
Plays set in the 1920s
Plays set in the 1930s
Plays based on real people
Scottish plays
British plays adapted into films
Biographical plays about criminals
Cultural depictions of Peter Kürten